The Cabinet of Brazil, also called Council of Ministers or Council of Government, is composed of the Ministers of State and senior advisors of the executive branch of the federal government of Brazil. Cabinet officers are appointed and dismissed by the President. There are currently twenty-three Ministries, including six Ministry-level offices: the Chief of Staff, General-Secretariat of the Presidency, Secretariat of Institutional Relations, Secretariat of Social Communication, Personal Office of the President of the Republic and the Institutional Security Office. Other institutions also assists the Presidency.

Responsibilities
Ministers assist the President of the Republic in the exercise of executive power. Each minister is responsible for the general administration of a government portfolio, and heads the corresponding government ministry. Ministers prepare standards, monitor and evaluate federal programs, and formulate and implement policies for the sectors they represent. They are also responsible for establishing strategies, policies and priorities in the application of public resources. Generally, the  minister considered to be the highest-ranking is the Chief of Staff, while other high-profile ministers include Finance, Justice, External Relations and Defense.

Current cabinet
As of 1 January 2023:

See also
 Federal institutions of Brazil

References

External links
 gov.br Official Brazilian Government Portal
 Presidência da República Official website of the Presidency of Brazil
 e.Gov Official Government Services and Information Portal

 
Executive branch of Brazil
Brazil